May Martin Van Wye (1878–1968) was a member of the Ohio House of Representatives and the Ohio Senate. She was one of the first six women elected into the Ohio General Assembly in 1922. In 1962, she published her first novel, "Eve's Tower," which is loosely based on her experiences as a female state senator.

Van Wye was born May Martin on December 31, 1878, in Brooklyn, New York to Lewis E. Martin and Ella M. Seaman. She married Benjamin C. Van Wye (1867–1940), who became professor of speech at the University of Cincinnati. She died August 26, 1968, in Cincinnati, Ohio.

References

External links

Profile on the Ohio Ladies' Gallery website
May M. Van Wye Media collection on The Ohio Channel
Full text of Van Wye's novel, "Eve's Tower"

1878 births
1968 deaths
Republican Party members of the Ohio House of Representatives
Women state legislators in Ohio
Republican Party Ohio state senators
People from Brooklyn